Johnnie Bryant (born August 6, 1985) is an American professional basketball coach who serves as associate head coach for the New York Knicks of the National Basketball Association (NBA). He played college basketball for the University of Utah.

Playing career
Bryant played the 2003–04 season at San Francisco City College. During the 2004–05 season he transferred to the University of Utah, where he redshirted the remainder of the season. As a sophomore, Bryant earned honorable mention All-Mountain West Conference, appearing in all 29 games. As a junior, Bryant also earned honorable mention All-Mountain West Conference, averaging 15.1 points per game.

Bryant holds the University of Utah's career three-point percentage record (.440).

Coaching career
Bryant started coaching at the Bryant Sports Academy, a skill development program through which he worked with athletes of all ages, including former Utah Jazz forward Paul Millsap and Portland Trail Blazers guard Damian Lillard.

On September 25, 2012, Bryant was hired by the Utah Jazz as a player development assistant. On June 24, 2014, he was promoted to assistant coach under head coach Quin Snyder.

On September 4, 2020, Bryant was named the associate head coach of the New York Knicks.

References

External links
 Johnnie Bryant College Stats

1985 births
Living people
American men's basketball coaches
American men's basketball players
City College of San Francisco Rams men's basketball players
New York Knicks assistant coaches
People from Oakland, California
Utah Jazz assistant coaches
Utah Utes men's basketball players